1979 Academy Awards may refer to:

 51st Academy Awards, the Academy Awards ceremony that took place in 1979
 52nd Academy Awards, the 1980 ceremony honoring the best in film for 1979